Reflekt were an English electronic music duo consisting of DJ/remixer/producers Seb Fontaine and Jay Peake (aka Jay P. - one half of Stretch & Vern).

Biography
Reflekt are best known for their 2004 club hit "Need to Feel Loved", which reached number 1 on the British Dance Chart. The song sampled "Ghosts", part of the soundtrack to the 2002 film The Road to Perdition and was featured in the 2005 British/Canadian film It's All Gone Pete Tong. "Need to Feel Loved" reached number 14 on the UK Singles Chart in March 2005.

Discography

Singles

References

External links
Profile at e.discogs.com

English dance music groups
English house music duos
English DJs
Male musical duos
Musical groups established in 2004
Electronic dance music duos